The balbo sabretooth, Evermannella balbo, is a sabertooth of the family Evermannellidae, found circumglobally in tropical and subtropical seas, at depths of between 100 and 1,000 m.  Its length is up to 17 cm. 

E. balbo have upward tubular eyes which aid in the organism to process focused imaging, this particular structure is located on the retina. Because of this, E. balbo reside mainly in the deep. E. balbo have optical folds on the retina which helps them navigate the dark either by absorption of light or refraction.

References
 
 Tony Ayling & Geoffrey Cox, Collins Guide to the Sea Fishes of New Zealand,  (William Collins Publishers Ltd, Auckland, New Zealand 1982) 
 Wagner, H.-J., Partridge, J. C., & Douglas, R. H. (2019). Observations on the retina and “optical fold” of a mesopelagic sabretooth fish, Evermanella balbo. Cell and Tissue Research, 378(3), 411–425. 

Evermannellidae
Fish described in 1820